Masts of Manhatta is the fourth album by American singer/songwriter Tracy Bonham. It was released on July 13, 2010 by Engine Room Recordings in the United States and Lojinx in the UK.

Track listing
All songs by Tracy Bonham

"Devil's Got Your Boyfriend"
"Your Night Is Wide Open"
"Big Red Heart"
"Josephine"
"When You Laugh The World Laughs With You"
"We Moved Our City To The Country"
"Reciprocal Feelings"
"In The Moonlight"
"You're My Isness"
"Angel, Won't You Come Down?"
"I Love You Today"

Personnel
Tracy Bonham – Vocals, Violins, Fender Rhodes, Guitar, Piano, Claves, Spaghetti Pot, Cardboard Box
Smokey Hormel – Guitar
Tim Lunztel – Upright Bass, Electric upright bass
Andy Borger – Drums and Percussion
Dan Cho – Cello on 2, 7, 11
Matt Glaser – Fiddle on 10
Ken Rich – Tuba on 4
Andrew Sherman – Wurlitzer on 2
Josh Lattanzi – Slide Guitar on 9
Konrad Meissner – Percussion on 5

Production
Producer: Tracy Bonham
Mastered by Adam Ayan at Gateway Mastering, Portland, ME
Artwork by Donnie Molls
Design layout and revisions by Megan Volz

References 

Tracy Bonham albums
2010 albums
Engine Room Recordings albums